Makomako may refer to:
 Aristotelia serrata ("wineberry"), a tree endemic to New Zealand
 New Zealand bellbird, a bird endemic to New Zealand
A minor settlement and stream near Aotea Harbour, in the Waikato region of New Zealand